The University of California Student Association (UCSA) is an active 501(c)(3) unincorporated association, purposed as a student association of all University of California (UC) students. Its charter states that it "shall exist to: serve the interests of the current and future students of the University of California and promotes [sic] cooperation between various student governments of the University and student organizations concerned with higher education." The Association is not a public agency, but its leadership is composed of representatives of UC student governments, which are "official units of the University" system (with one exception). UCSA participates in various aspects of the UC system's governance, notably including the selection of the student representative on the UC Board of Regents.

UCSA representatives have opposed education funding cuts and increases in student fees and supported affirmative action in enrollment policies. The association mobilizes students via voter registration campaigns; it recorded 26,000 new voter registrations in 2006, and added 12,300 new registrations in 2008 for the California Democratic and Republican primaries. In April 2016, UCSA called for the removal of then-chancellor of UC Davis, Linda Katehi. In January and October 2017, UCSA called for the removal of Norman Pattiz, a UC Regent, due to sexual harassment allegations that Pattiz has admitted to.

Governance
UCSA's governing body is its board of directors, which is chartered to be made up of the external vice presidents of all UC student governments. However, UCSA generally requires each student government to pay dues to maintain voting rights on the board. Thus, student governments may effectively "withdraw" from UCSA by refusing to pay dues.

In May 2017, the UCSA board of directors included voting members from 18 student governments.  That number dropped to 11 in 2018 because a number of professional and graduate student governments withdrew from UCSA and formed a separate organization named "University of California Graduate and Professional Council".

, the UCSA board of directors included voting members from the following student governments:

 Associated Students of the University of California (UC Berkeley)
 Associated Students, UC Davis (previously withdrew in 2006)
 Associated Students, UC Irvine (previously withdrew in 2014)
 Undergraduate Students Association Council (UCLA)
 Graduate Students Association of UCLA (previously withdrew in 2008)
 Associated Students of UC Merced
 Associated Students of UC Riverside
 UC San Diego Associated Students
 Associated Students of UC Santa Barbara
 Graduate Students Association of UC Santa Barbara
 Student Union Assembly (UC Santa Cruz)

Student regent selection
Southern and northern regional UC student nominating commissions annually select ten semifinalists for University of California student regent. These semifinalists are then interviewed by the UCSA board of directors. The board chooses three applicants, who are then interviewed by a special Regents' committee. The committee then recommends a nominee to the full board of University of California Regents.

See also
 African Black Coalition
 California State Student Association
 National Association of Graduate-Professional Students
 Student Senate for California Community Colleges
 United States Student Association

References

External links
 
 UCSA at ProPublica's Nonprofit Explorer

University of California
California
501(c)(3) organizations
Groups of students' unions
Organizations based in Oakland, California
Non-profit organizations based in the San Francisco Bay Area
Student organizations in California
Education advocacy groups
Lobbying organizations in the United States
Politics of California
1971 establishments in California